The Ceres Workstation was a workstation computer built by Niklaus Wirth's group at ETH Zurich in 1987.The central processing unit (CPU) is a National Semiconductor NS32000, and the operating system, named Oberon System is written fully in the object-oriented programming language Oberon. It is an early example of an operating system using basic object-oriented principles and garbage collection on the system level and a document centered approach for the user interface (UI), as envisaged later with OpenDoc. Ceres was a follow-up project to the Lilith workstation, based on AMD bit slicing technology and the programming language Modula-2.  

On the same hardware, Clemens Szyperski implemented as part of his Doctor of Philosophy (PhD) thesis an operating system named ETHOS, which takes full advantage of object-oriented technologies. A Usenet posting by Szyperski says that Oberon/F, which was later renamed to BlackBox Component Builder, incorporates  ETHOS ideas and principles.

Links
 ETH Computer Science History: Lilith & Ceres
 Ceres-1 and Ceres-3 at the Computer History Museum, Mountain View, California, USA (see also its publications, especially pages 6 & 7 of Core 3.1)
  (ETH Technical Report 93)
  (ETH Technical Report 168)

References

Computer workstations